Heading can refer to:
 Heading (metalworking), a process which incorporates the extruding and upsetting processes
 Headline, text at the top of a newspaper article
 Heading (navigation), the direction a person or vehicle is facing, usually similar to its course
 Aircraft heading, the direction that the aircraft's nose is pointing
 Double-heading, the use of two locomotives at the front of a train
 Subject heading, an integral part of bibliographic control
 Using one's head to move an airborne football or volleyball
 Heading off, (especially with regard to livestock, sports or military action), circling around to prevent livestock or opponents from fleeing. See Heading dog.
 Heading date, a parameter in barley cultivation
 Heading, part of a flag used to attach it to the halyard; see Flag#Hoisting the flag.

See also 

 Head (disambiguation)
 Header (disambiguation)
 Headed (disambiguation)